Augustea SpA is a traditional shipping company from Naples, Italy founded in 1629.

The basic facts:

In 1629 Pietro Antonio Cafiero created a mutual aid fund "Monte della S.S. Annunziata dei Cafiero", which was rescuing sailors kidnapped by Barbary pirates.
Now Augustea Group employs about 630 people working on company's 50 vessels, tugs and barges and controls another 24 ocean vessels.
Augustea's fleet fully complies with the International Safety Management Code. 
Augustea Group achieved accreditation ISO 9001 and ISO 14000.

See also 
List of oldest companies

References

External links 
Homepage
Location on Google Maps

Shipbuilding companies of Italy
Companies established in the 17th century
17th-century establishments in the Kingdom of Naples
1629 establishments in Italy